Reel Life Productions, also known as Gothom, is an independent record label formed in 1990. Based in Detroit, Michigan in the United States, it was formed by rapper Esham and his older brother James H. Smith.

Catalog

References

External links
Reel Life Productions official website
Reel Life Productions discography at Discogs
Overcore discography at Discogs

 
Discographies of American record labels
Hip hop discographies
Reel Life Productions